Washing is a method of cleaning, usually with water and soap or detergent.  Washing and then rinsing both body and clothing is an essential part of good hygiene and health. 

Often people use soaps and detergents to assist in the emulsification of oils and dirt particles so they can be washed away. The soap can be applied directly, or with the aid of a washcloth.

People wash themselves, or bathe periodically for religious ritual or therapeutic purposes or as a recreational activity.

In Europe, some people use a bidet to wash their external genitalia and the anal region after using the toilet, instead of using toilet paper. The bidet is common in predominantly Catholic countries where water is considered essential for anal cleansing.

More frequent is washing of just the hands, e.g. before and after preparing food and eating, after using the toilet, after handling something dirty, etc.  Hand washing is important in reducing the spread of germs. Also common is washing the face, which is done after waking up, or to keep oneself cool during the day. Brushing one's teeth is also essential for hygiene and is a part of washing.

'Washing' can also refer to the washing of clothing or other cloth items, like bedsheets, whether by hand or with a washing machine. It can also refer to washing one's car, by lathering the exterior with car soap, then rinsing it off with a hose, or washing cookware.

Excessive washing may damage the hair, causing dandruff, or cause rough skin/skin lesions.

See also 

 Bathing
 Car wash
 Cleaning agent
 Cleanliness
 Hygiene
 Hygiene in Christianity
 Dishwashing
 Hand washing
 Laundry symbols, washing machine
 Sanitation
 Wikibooks:Car Washing Techniques

References 

Hygiene
Cleaning methods